2018 in professional wrestling describes the year's events in the world of professional wrestling.

List of notable promotions 
These promotions held notable shows in 2018.

Calendar of notable shows

January

February

March

April

May

June

July

August

September

October

November

December

Accomplishments and tournaments

All Japan Pro-Wrestling (AJPW)

Consejo Mundial de Lucha Libre (CMLL)

International Wrestling Revolution Group (IWRG)

Lucha Libre AAA Worldwide (AAA)

National Wrestling Alliance (NWA)

New Japan Pro-Wrestling (NJPW)

Pro Wrestling Noah

Pro Wrestling Zero1

WWE

Title changes

CMLL

Impact Wrestling

IWRG

Lucha Libre AAA Worldwide

MLW

NJPW

NWA

ROH

The Crash Lucha Libre

WWE
 – Raw
 – SmackDown
 – NXT
 – NXT UK

Raw and SmackDown
Raw and SmackDown each had a world championship, a secondary championship, a women's championship, and a male tag team championship. Raw also had a championship for their cruiserweight wrestlers, which became exclusive to the 205 Live brand.

NXT

NXT UK

Awards and honors

AAA

AAA Hall of Fame

WWE

WWE Hall of Fame

Debuts

 January 4 
 Hikari Noa
 Miu Watanabe
 February 3 – Akira Hyodo
 February 24 – Edith Surreal
 April 8 – Ronda Rousey
 April 22 – Rina Shingaki
 May 3 – Yuki Aino
 May 13 – Rina Amikura
 May 27 – Mei Suruga
 June 11 – Kota Minoura
 July 18 – Omos
 August 5 
 Mina Shirakawa
 Yoshiki Inamura
 August 12 – Utami Hayashishita
 September 2 – Ryuki Honda
 October 28 
 Jessamyn Duke
 Marina Shafir
 Yuki Arai
 November 6 – Dragon Dia
 November 15 – Yuko Sakurai
 November 17 – Hokuto Omori
 November 18 – Mei Hoshizuki
 November 19 – Momoka Hanazono
 December 24 – Maria
 December 31 – Suzu Suzuki

Retirements
 Aoi Kizuki (2005–2018)
 Azusa Takigawa (2015–2018)
 Bob Backlund (1973–1985, 1988–2001, 2007–2011, 2018) 
 Mark Henry (March 11, 1996–April 27, 2018)
 Great Khali (October 7, 2000–April 27, 2018) 
 Mika Iida (November 21, 2010–May 4, 2018)
 Great Kabuki (1964–September 30, 2018) 
 Daigoro Kashiwa (2001–2018)
 Gene Snitsky (1997–2018)
 Chicky Starr (1975–2018)
 Mark Jindrak (1999–2018)
 Maho Kurone (2016–2018)

Deaths

 January 2 – Mountain Fiji, 60
 April 4 – Johnny Valiant, 71
 April 18 
Bruno Sammartino, 82
Paul Jones, 75
 April 21 – Neff Maivia, 93
 May 1 – Universo 2000, 55
 May 8 – Big Bully Busick, 63
 June 1 – Rockin' Rebel, 52
 June 13 – Arkangel de la Muerte, 52
 June 18 – Big Van Vader, 63
 June 29 – Matt Cappotelli, 38
 July 8 – Piratita Morgan, 49
 July 14 – Masa Saito, 76
 July 19 – Rayo de Jalisco Sr., 85
 July 29
 Brickhouse Brown, 57
 Nikolai Volkoff, 70
 Brian Christopher, 46 
 August 9 – Brian Danovich, 38 
 August 10 – Steve Travis, 67 
 August 13 
 Jim Neidhart, 63
 Ian Dean, 48
 August 21 – Villano III, 66
 August 22 – Chris Champion, 57
 August 27 – Aya Koyama, 45
 August 30 – Ray, 36
 September 4 – Lee Wang-pyo, 64
 September 5 – Mike Hogewood, 63
 September 9 – Frank Andersson, 62
 September 14 – Ethel Johnson, 83
 October 8 – Wajima Hiroshi, 70
 October 13 – Don Leo Jonathan, 87
 October 18 – Dick Slater, 67
 November 6 – José Lothario, 83
 November 25 – Larry Matysik, 71
 December 5 – Dynamite Kid, 60
 December 6 – Larry Hennig, 82
 December 13 – Bill Fralic, 56
 December 19 – Raúl Mata, 71
 December 29 – Dieusel Berto, 60

See also
List of GFW events and specials
List of MLW events
List of NWA pay-per-view events
List of NJPW pay-per-view events
List of ROH pay-per-view events
List of Impact Wrestling pay-per-view events
List of WWE Network events
List of WWE pay-per-view events

References

 
professional wrestling